The Royal Order of the Elephant of Godenu is a dynastic Order of Merit in the sub-national kingdom of Godenu, Volta Region of Ghana.

The current Grand Master of the Order is the traditional ruler Togbe Osei III.

Medals and grades 
The Order is awarded in three grades:
  Grand Cross (GCREG)
  Commander (CREG)
  Knight (KREG) or Dame (DREG)
The Order is usually granted for life in all grades. Only rarely, at the Grand Cross level, may it be granted as an hereditary dignity to reward exceptional service to the Royal House.

Privileges 

All members of the Order are entitled to use the honorary title of "Knight" or "Dame".

Recipients of the Grand Cross may use the prefix style of "His or Her Excellency". Recipients of the two other grades may use the prefix style of "The Honourable".

Members may wear the appropriate Insignia for their grade and use the Insignia in their heraldry.

See also 
 Royal Order of the Lion of Godenu
 Orders, decorations, and medals of Ghana

References

External links 
 Royal House of Godenu Official Website

Orders, decorations, and medals of Ghana
Orders of chivalry in Africa